The Southern Alpiners are a New Zealand based field hockey club, originating from the nation's Southern region. The club was established in 2020, and is one of four established to compete in Hockey New Zealand's new premier domestic competition, the Premier Hockey League.

The club unifies both men and women under one name.

The Southern Alpiners competed for the first time in the inaugural season of Premier Hockey League, where the men's and women's teams finished in second and fourth place in their respective tournaments.

History
Along with three other teams, the Southern Alpiners were founded in 2020 as part of Hockey New Zealand's development of hockey. 

The team comprises players from the whole of Te Waipounamu, the South Island of New Zealand. The team are named after the Southern Alps, the mountain range which extends down the majority of the South Island.

Teams

Men
The following players represented the men's team during the 2020 edition of the Sentinel Homes Premier Hockey League.

Louis Beckert (GK)
George Enersen (GK)
Joseph Morrison
George Connell
Hugo Inglis
Nicholas Elder
Kane Russell
Nicholas Lidstone
Nicholas Ross
Maxwell Rasmussen
Dominic Newman
Gus Wakeling
Finn Ward
Dylan Thomas
Jordan Wards
Malachi Buschl
Samuel Lane
David Brydon
Blair Tarrant
Simon Yorston
Moss Jackson

Women
The following players represented the women's team during the 2020 edition of the Sentinel Homes Premier Hockey League.

Kirsty Nation (GK)
Saasha Marsters (GK)
Phoebe Steele
Olivia Merry
Anna Crowley
Tessa Jopp
Georgina Mackay-Stewart
Millie Calder
Leah Butt
Belinda Smith
Hayley Cox
Frances Davies
Jessica Anderson
Catherine Tinning
Brittany Wang
Emily Wium
Margot Willis
[[Michaela Curtis]]
<li value=20>Isabella Ambrosius 
<li value=21>Charlotte Lee
{{div col end}}

References
{{reflist}}

External links
[https://blacksticksnz.co.nz/wp-content/uploads/2020/10/TheAlpiners.pdf Southern Alpiners]

[[Category:New Zealand field hockey clubs]]
[[Category:Women's field hockey teams in New Zealand]]
[[Category:Sports clubs in New Zealand]]
[[Category:Sports clubs established in 2020]]
[[Category:2020 establishments in New Zealand]]

{{Fieldhockey-team-stub}}